Seizure types most commonly follow the classification proposed by the International League Against Epilepsy (ILAE) in 1981. These classifications have been updated in 2017. Distinguishing between seizure types is important since different types of seizure may have different causes, outcomes and treatments.

International classification of seizure types (1981)

This classification is based on observation (clinical and EEG) rather than the underlying pathophysiology or anatomy.

Focal seizures (Older term: partial seizures)
 Simple partial seizures – consciousness is not impaired
 With motor signs
 With sensory symptoms
 With autonomic symptoms or signs
 With psychic symptoms
 Complex partial seizures – consciousness is impaired (*Note: impaired does not necessarily mean [fully] lost) (Older terms: temporal lobe or psychomotor seizures)
 Simple partial onset, followed by impairment of consciousness
 With impairment of consciousness at onset
 Partial seizures evolving to secondarily generalized seizures
 Simple partial seizures evolving to generalized seizures
 Complex partial seizures evolving to generalized seizures
 Simple partial seizures evolving to complex partial seizures evolving to generalized seizures
 Generalized seizures
 Absence seizures (Older term: petit mal, meaning 'small, or smaller, bad')
 Myoclonic seizures
 Clonic seizures
 Generalized tonic–clonic seizures (Older term: grand mal, meaning 'great, or greater, bad')
 Atonic seizures
 Unclassified epileptic seizures

In terms of their origin within the brain, seizures may be described as either partial (focal) or generalized. Partial seizures only involve a localized part of the brain, whereas generalized seizures involve the whole of both hemispheres. The term 'secondary generalisation' may be used to describe a partial seizure that later spreads to the whole of the cortex and becomes generalized.

Whilst most seizures can be neatly split into partial and generalized, there exists some that don't fit. For example: the seizure may be generalized only within one hemisphere. Alternatively there may be many focal points (multifocal seizures) that are distributed in a symmetrical or asymmetrical pattern.

Partial seizures

Partial seizures may be further subdivided into both simple and complex seizures. This refers to the effect of such a seizure on consciousness; simple seizures cause no interruption to consciousness (although they may cause sensory distortions or other sensations), whereas complex seizures interrupt consciousness to varying degrees. This does not necessarily mean that the person experiencing this sort of seizure will lose consciousness (like fainting). For example, a complex partial seizure may involve the unconscious repetition of simple actions, gestures or verbal utterances, or simply a blank stare and apparent unawareness of the occurrence of the seizure, followed by no memory of the seizure.  Other patients may report a feeling of tunnel vision or dissociation, which represents a diminishment of awareness without full loss of consciousness.  Still other patients can perform complicated actions, such as travel or shopping, while in the midst of a complex partial seizure.

The effects of partial seizures can be quite dependent on the area of the brain in which they are active. For example, a partial seizure in areas involved in perception may cause a particular sensory experience (for example, the perception of a scent, music or flashes of light) whereas, when centred in the motor cortex, a partial seizure might cause movement in particular groups of muscles. This type of seizure may also produce particular thoughts or internal visual images or even experiences which may be distinct but not easily described. Seizures affecting the anterior insular cortex may produce brief mystical or ecstatic experiences in some people; these are known as ecstatic seizures. They may result in a misdiagnosis of psychosis or schizophrenia, if other symptoms of seizure are disregarded and other tests are not performed. Unfortunately for those with epilepsy, anti-psychotic medications prescribed without anticonvulsants in this case can actually lower the seizure threshold further and worsen the symptoms.

When the effects of a partial seizure appear as a 'warning sign' before a larger seizure, they are known as an aura: frequently, a partial seizure will spread to other parts of the brain and eventually become generalized, resulting in a tonic-clonic convulsion. The subjective experience of an aura, like other partial seizures, will tend to reflect the function of the affected part of the brain.

Generalized seizures

Primarily generalized seizures can be sub-classified into a number of categories, depending on their behavioural effects:
 Absence seizures involve an interruption to consciousness where the person experiencing the seizure seems to become vacant and unresponsive for a short period of time (usually up to 30 seconds). Slight muscle twitching may occur. The victim appears to be day dreaming. These seizure may occur several times during a day. This type of seizure is more common in children.
 Myoclonic seizures involve an extremely brief (< 0.1 second) muscle contraction and can result in jerky movements of muscles or muscle groups.
 Clonic seizures are myoclonus that are regularly repeating at a rate typically of 2-3 per second. In some cases, the length varies.
 Tonic–clonic seizures involve an initial contraction of the muscles (tonic phase) which may involve tongue biting, urinary incontinence and the absence of breathing. This is followed by rhythmic muscle contractions (clonic phase). This type of seizure is usually what is referred to when the term 'epileptic fit' is used colloquially.
 Atonic seizures involve the loss of muscle tone, causing the person to fall to the ground. These are sometimes called 'drop attacks' but should be distinguished from similar looking attacks that may occur in cataplexy.

Continuous seizures

Status epilepticus refers to continuous seizure activity with no recovery between successive seizures.   A tonic-clonic seizure lasting longer than 5 minutes (or two minutes longer than a given person's usual seizures) is considered a medical emergency. Benzodiazepines are most commonly used to relieve the seizure activity. Lorazepam is drug of choice in status epilepticus. Diazepam is 2nd priority to treat status epilepticus.

Epilepsia partialis continua is a rare type of focal motor seizure (hands and face) which recurs every few seconds or minutes for extended periods (days or years).  It is usually due to strokes in adults and focal cortical inflammatory processes in children (Rasmussen's encephalitis), possibly caused by chronic viral infections or autoimmune processes.

Subclinical seizures 
Subclinical seizures are defined as seizures which can only be detected by reading an electroencephalogram (EEG) and cause no overt, specific changes in an affected person's behavior, whether the person is awake or asleep. One study in the Journal of Neurosurgery described the pattern on EEG as appearing like "rhythmic spik[es] showing intrinsic evolution".

Future classifications

In 1997, the ILAE began work on revising the classification of seizures, epilepsies and epileptic syndromes. This revision remains in gestation and has not superseded the 1981 classification.

Proposed changes to terminology include:
 Replace partial with the older term focal to describe seizures that originate in one part of the brain (though not necessarily a small or well defined area). The word partial was regarded as ambiguous.
 Drop the terms simple partial and complex partial - grouping based on the effect to consciousness is no longer regarded as useful.
 Replace cryptogenic with probably symptomatic.

The hierarchy presented has the structure:

Self limiting seizure types
Generalized seizures
Tonic-clonic seizures (includes variations beginning with a clonic or myoclonic phase)
Clonic seizures (with and without tonic features)
Typical absence seizures
Atypical absence seizures
Myoclonic absence seizures
Tonic seizures
Spasms
Myoclonic seizures
Massive bilateral myoclonus
Eyelid myoclonia (with and without absences)
Myoclonic atonic seizures
Negative myoclonus
Atonic seizures
Reflex seizures in generalized epilepsy syndromes
Seizures of the posterior neocortex
Neocortical temporal lobe seizures
Focal seizures
Focal sensory seizures
Focal motor seizures
Gelastic seizures
Hemiclonic seizures
Secondarily generalized seizures
Reflex seizures in focal epilepsy syndromes
Continuous seizure types
Generalized status epilepticus
Generalized tonic-clonic status epilepticus
Clonic status epilepticus
Absence status epilepticus
Tonic status epilepticus
Myoclonic status epilepticus
Focal status epilepticus
Epilepsia partialis continua of Kojevnikov
Aura continua
Limbic status epilepticus (psychomotor status)
Hemiconvulsive status with hemiparesis

Earlier classifications

The 1981 classification revised the 1970 ILAE system devised by Henri Gastaut. A significant difference was the distinction between simple and complex partial seizures. In the 1970 classification, the distinction was whether the symptoms involved elementary sensory or motor functions (simple) or whether "higher functions" were involved (complex).
This was changed to consider whether consciousness was fully retained or not. As a result, studies that group patients according to these classifications are not directly comparable from one generation to another. The 1970 classification was important for standardising the modern terms for many seizure types. Prior to this, terms such as petit mal, grand mal, Jacksonian, psychomotor and temporal-lobe seizures were used.

The earliest classification of seizures can be attributed to Babylonian scholars who inscribed their medical knowledge into stone tablets known as the Sakikku (meaning All Diseases). This dates from the reign of the Babylonian king Adad-apla-iddina of the Second Dynasty of Isin - estimated to be between 1067 and 1046 BC. Many types of seizures are described, each attributed to a certain demon or departed spirit and given a prognosis.

References

Further reading

External links
 Types of Seizures
 Seizures Associated with LGS

 
Epilepsy
Epilepsy types